Cytherella fragum is a species of seed shrimp in the family Cytherellidae.

References

Crustaceans described in 1993
Podocopa